The former U.S. Post Office-Green River is a Classical Revival architecture building designed by James Wetmore and Thomas Hyrum in Green River, Wyoming that was built in 1931. It was built under the Elliot Act, a pre-New Deal economic recovery plan. In 1967, the building was repurposed and is now Sweetwater County Historical Museum. It was listed on the National Register of Historic Places in 1997.  Its 1997 listing included alternative name Trudel's Restaurante.

References

External links
 United States Post Office - Green River, Wyoming at the Wyoming State Historic Preservation Office

Post office buildings on the National Register of Historic Places in Wyoming
Neoclassical architecture in Wyoming
Government buildings completed in 1931
Buildings and structures in Sweetwater County, Wyoming
Green River, Wyoming
National Register of Historic Places in Sweetwater County, Wyoming